Baby Gramps  is an American guitar performer, who, though born in Miami, Florida, has been based in the Northwest U.S. for at least the last 40 years. He is famous for his palindromes. Baby Gramps started performing in 1964 and is still playing professionally as of 2018.

Style

Baby Gramps plays a mixture of styles and eras including traditional blues, children's and labor songs, and his own compositions.  His busy and unusual guitar style includes flat and finger picking, and "chording" with the back of his hand and his elbow.  His singing styles include throat singing.  His performance is based in part on improvisation and he often encourages audience participation.  Baby Gramps has performed as a street musician, and has toured with Artis the Spoonman, Béla Fleck and the Flecktones and Phish. His rendition of "The Teddy Bears' Picnic" was featured in Martin Bell's Academy Award-nominated documentary film, Streetwise.

Popularity

Writer Patrick Ferris said he has "a mass appeal in the sense that any audience between the age of 2 and 102 are captivated by his vaudeville antics, hilarious lyrics and animated guitar playing... His voice is a cross between Popeye the Sailor and a Didgeridoo and the plinkity plink of his VERY worn National steel guitar, sounds like a wind up jack in the box. If you listen closely and know anything about music, you'll realize Gramps is an absolutely incredible guitar player. Being a professional musician for over 40 years can't help but give you some sort of chops, but Gramps is a modern day Robert Johnson; a revolutionary guitarist that, like Thelonious Monk on piano, can play the notes 'between the cracks.'"

Discography
 Same Ol' Timeously: Vocalisthenics & Stunt Guitar (CD, Grampophone 1001), 2000
 Hossradish CD (Baby Gramps Trio), 2003
 Baptized on Swamp Water CD (Baby Gramps & his Back Swamp Potioners), 2006
 Rogue's Gallery: Pirate Ballads, Sea Songs, and Chanteys (two tracks, 'Cape Cod Girls' and 'Old Man of the Sea' on compilation CD), Anti-Records, 2006
 Outertainment CD (Baby Gramps & Peter Stampfel), Red Newt Records, 2010

Videos:
 SomeDemos Originally released on VHS in 1996 Re-released on DVD together with "Sauteed To A Fine Crisp" in 2006.
Filmed on 8/26/93 when Baby Gramps opened for Phish in Portland OR.
1) Richland Woman Blues
2) Back Swamp Potioner
3) Let's all be fairies
Running time: 20 min.
Produced/Directed/Edited By Sam Small for Small Wonder Video Services.
Baby Gramps actually shared the stage with Phish, performing the enigmatic “Tea Tray Song” with Fishman on vacuum during the second set.

 Sauteed To A Fine Crisp Originally released on VHS in 1999 Re-released on DVD together with "SomeDemos" in 2006.
 "Breakfast Blues"
 "Anagram Song"
 "The Shortest Poem In The World"
 "The Wooden Darning Egg"
 "Nothin' But A Nothin'"
 "Palindromes"
 "Uncontrovertable Facts"
 "The Big Rock Candy Mountain"
 "Teddybears' Picnic"
Running time: 37 min.
This video was stitched together from three performances that were filmed at "Funhouse": A Contemporary Theatre, in conjunction with TheatreVision and ShadowCatcher Entertainment. Conceived and directed by Paul Magid and Ron W. Bailey. Stage show written by Magid; teleplay written by Magid and Alex Metcalf; musical direction by Mark Ettinger. "Funhouse" starred vaudevillians Dmitri Karamazov of the Flying Karamazov Brothers, Rebecca Chace, Cathy Sutherland and the UMO Ensemble, and featured Baby Gramps and Christian Swenson, among others. A psychedelically inspired feast was served by Chez Ray Sewal. The raw multi-camera video from three of Gramp's solo performances were given over to Sam Small of Small Wonder Video Services who edited and released 'Sauteed To A Fine Crisp'.

 I Shall Continuum! Released on DVD in 2004. Produced, Directed and Edited by Sam Small for Small Wonder Video Services
Recorded Live at Terra Blues, Greenwich Village, NYC
 "Ankle Wrench Rag
 "New Big Rock Candy Mountain
 A Ragtime Continuum / "Rags Makes Paper" / "Paper Makes Money" / "A Man Took A Ride In An Airplane"
 A Ragtime Medley: "Ragged But Right" / "Certain l Am Living' A Ragtime Life"
 "Charge It To The Dust & Let The Rain Settle It"
 "Dream A Little Dream Of Me"
 "Skillet Of Snakes"
 "Satisfied Mind"
 "Thought I Heard The Voice Of A Porkchop Say Come Unto Me & Rest"
 "Ballad Of A Thin Man" (Mr. Jones)
 "Possum Opera"

Notes

References

 Denise Sullivan, A Grand Ol’ Timeously With Baby Gramps, Crawdaddy Magazine, August 13, 2008
 Jonathan Zwickel, An Introduction to Baby Gramps, a musical enigma, Seattle Times, December 24, 2009
 Phish.net – people: Baby Gramps

External links

 babygramps.com
 
 2003 interview with HotBands.com 
 Excerpts from SomeDemos 5:39
 Excerpts from Sauteed To A Fine Crisp 9:00

Living people
Year of birth missing (living people)
American blues singers
American blues guitarists
American male guitarists
Pedal steel guitarists
American street performers
Fast Folk artists
Unidentified musicians